Ning Baizura binti Sheikh Hamzah (born 28 June 1975), better known by her stage name Ning Baizura, is a Malaysian pop and R&B singer, actress who sings in Malay, English, Japanese, Italian, French, Mandarin and Cantonese.

Early life
She was born in Kajang, Malaysia from parents of Arab, Malay, Dutch, Indian, Chinese and Javanese ancestry. She is an alumnus of Convent Kajang Secondary School.

Career
Ning crossed into the commercial scene in 1992 and became a recording artiste under various international labels, including (Sony, BMG, AMS Records Japan and Warner Music Group. From September 2008, she has recorded songs in the genres of pop, soul and R&B for her own music label, HappeNings Records. Her discography includes ten full studio albums (three of which are full English albums), as well as numerous compilations.

Personal life
Baizura is married to Omar Shariff Christopher Layton Dalton who is English. They first met at Ning's best friend's wedding in Bali, Indonesia. Their wedding  took place on 31 January 2008 at the Saidina Abu Bakar as-Siddiq Mosque in Bangsar, Kuala Lumpur. They have one child.

Discography

Album
 1993 – Dekat Padamu (Sony Music)
 1994 – Ning (Sony Music)
 1995 – Teguh (BMG)
 1997 – Ke Sayup Bintang (BMG)
 1997 – Always (BMG)
 1999 – Pujaan Ku (BMG)
 2001 – Natural Woman (AMS Records,Japan)
 2003 – Selagi Ada... (Warner)
 2004 – Erti Pertemuan (Warner)
 2008 – EastTo West
 2010 – 3 Suara (with Jaclyn Victor & Shila Amzah)
 2011 – Dewa
 2013 – Kekal

Filmography

Film

Telemovie

Television series

Theatre

Awards and nominations

 1991 – Voice of Asia
 1991 – Best Artiste Development Award
 1993 – AIM Awards: Best New Artiste
 1993 — AIM Awards: Album of the Year (Dekat Padamu)
 1993 — Anugerah Juara Lagu: Best Song – Ballad Category (Curiga)
 1994 — AIM Awards: Best Pop Album (Ning)
 1994 — Anugerah Juara Lagu: Best Song – Pop/Rock Category (Kau & Aku), award as lyricist
 2003 — Anugerah ERA: Choice Female Vocalist
 2004 — AIM Awards: Song of The Year (Selagi Ada Cinta)
 2005 — AIM Awards: Best Album Cover (Erti Pertemuan)
 2005 — AIM Awards: Best Music Video (Awan Yang Terpilu)
 2005 — AIM Awards: Song of The Year (Awan Yang Terpilu)
 2005 — AIM Awards: Best Pop Album (Erti Pertemuan)
 2008 — VOIZE Favourite Local Act Award
 2008 — Cosmopolitan Malaysia magazine's Fun, Fearless and Fabulous (FFF) Award 2008 – Singer category
 2011 — Anugerah Planet Muzik: Best Duo/Group (award for '3 Suara' with Jaclyn Victor and Shila Hamzah)
 2011 — AIM Awards: Best Vocal Performance In A Song Duo/Group – (Beribu Sesalan, award for '3 Suara' with Jaclyn Victor and Shila Hamzah)
 2011 — Anugerah Juara Lagu: Best Song (Runner-up) – (Beribu Sesalan, award for '3 Suara' with Jaclyn Victor and Shila Hamzah)
 2012 — Anugerah Bintang Popular Berita Harian: Most Popular Duo/Group (award for '3 Suara' with Jaclyn Victor and Shila Hamzah)
 2015 — Brandlaureate Awards: Country Branding award 
 2015 — Global Leadership Awards: Excellence is Entertainment award
 2015 — Global Branding Awards: Global Fashion Icon
 2017 — Anugerah Personaliti Industri & Usahawan Malaysia: Malaysia Music Icon award 
 2017 — McMillan Woods Global Awards Night: Jazz Diva of the Year

References

External links
 
 

1975 births
Living people
Indo people
Malaysian people of Arab descent
Malaysian people of Chinese descent
Malaysian people of Dutch descent
Malaysian people of Indian descent
Malaysian people of Javanese descent
Malaysian people of Malay descent
Malaysian Muslims
Malaysian women pop singers
Saudi Arabian people of Malay descent
Moroccan people of Malay descent
English-language singers from Malaysia
People from Selangor
Malay-language singers
Akademi Fantasia
Warner Music Group artists
Malaysian rhythm and blues singers
Malaysian soul singers
21st-century Malaysian women singers
Malaysian film actresses
Malaysian television actresses